The streak-throated bush tyrant (Myiotheretes striaticollis) is a species of bird in the family Tyrannidae.

It is found in Argentina, Bolivia, Colombia, Ecuador, Peru, and Venezuela. Its natural habitats are subtropical or tropical moist montane forests, subtropical or tropical high-altitude shrubland, and heavily degraded former forest.

References

streak-throated bush tyrant
Birds of the Northern Andes
streak-throated bush tyrant
streak-throated bush tyrant
Taxonomy articles created by Polbot